The International History Olympiad is a competition for top history students from around the world. The International History Olympiad was founded by International Academic Competitions (IAC), though prior participation in IAC events (such as the National History Bee and Bowl or International History Bee and Bowl), is not required for students to attend the Olympiad. The qualification process, events, and awards structure at the International History Olympiad are markedly different from the International Science Olympiads. Attending the International History Olympiad in person is open to qualified students age 10-19. Students compete in four separate age ranges: Varsity, Junior Varsity, Middle School, and Elementary as is the case at other IAC events.  
The first International History Olympiad was held in Williamsburg, VA in 2015 and the most recent International History Olympiad was held in New York City and Princeton, NJ from July 25 to August 1, 2022. At the closing ceremonies of the 2022 International History Olympiad, which were held on the  it was announced that the Olympiad would be held again in 2023 in Poland. IAC changed the venue from Poland to Rome for unknown reasons. After 2023, the Olympiad may be held annually if sufficient sponsorship is available, otherwise, it will be held on a biennial basis.

Qualification 

Students typically qualify for the Olympiad either by finishing in the top 25% of a regional or championship level tournament in either the International History Bee or the International History Bowl. US students must either win a National History Bee and Bowl regional bee or bowl or finish in the top half in either at the National Championships. Students who finish among the top students at the US National Championships or IHBB Divisional Championships may be awarded discounted or free entry, and/or travel stipends. Students who live over 400 kilometers from the nearest History Bee or Bowl tournaments or who could not attend due to extenuating circumstances may qualify by taking a specific exam administered by a teacher at their school. Qualification is valid for both the current academic year and the following (e.g. a student who qualifies in November 2022 could attend all Olympiads through the summer of 2024). There is no limit to the number of students from any one country or US state who can attend the International History Olympiad.

Events 

Approximately half of the competition events at the International History Olympiad follow a quiz bowl style format (utilizing a lock-out device buzzer system) with students competing individually. Students answer comprehensive, paragraph-length questions about specific topics in history, depending on the type of competition (e.g. Ancient History Bee, Art History Bee, etc.).

Two of the buzzer-based competitions, the International History Bee World Championships, and the International History Bowl World Championships, do not focus on specific aspects of history, but are meant to be comprehensive. The History Bowl World Championships feature students on teams (usually from the same US state or country) rather than from the same school, as is the case at other National History Bowl and International History Bowl tournaments.

Other competitions at the Olympiad include the Symposium, where students present and defend research papers they have written, various types of exams, games, and simulations of historical events (similar to Model UN historical crisis committees). The Olympiad also features a number of guest speakers, field trips, medals ceremonies for each event (complete with flags and national/state anthems), and opening and closing ceremonies.

Three events (the International History Bee World Championships, the Written Exam, and the Battery Exam) combine to form the official Olympiad championship for Elementary and Middle School Division students, while the Historiography competition replaces the International History Bee World Championships in the overall Olympiad championship calculation for the Varsity and Junior Varsity Divisions. Students are ranked in order of their performance on the three competitions within their age division; the students with the combined best ranks are the official Olympiad champions.

Affiliation and Medals 

All students at the International History Olympiad compete for a US state (if they attend school in the USA or are an American citizen) or for their country of citizenship or residence. Students who would be eligible to compete for two affiliations must select one. Medals are awarded solely to the top three competitors in each event, but they are awarded for every event. In this way, the Olympiad more closely approximates the Olympics than the International Science Olympiads. A medals table is maintained as well - the ranking is first done by total number of golds, then total number of silvers, then total number of bronzes. 
Students are also assigned to teams for the team events at the Olympiad based on a number of factors, though every effort is made to keep students from the same country or state together. Teams consist of either 2 or 3 students. For team events, if a "mixed" team wins a medal, the medals are credited fractionally on the medals table depending on how many students from a state or country were on the team.

Hosts

Overall Champions

Varsity

Junior Varsity

Middle school

Elementary

International History Bee World Champions 
At the end of the International History Olympiad, the International History Bee World Championships are contested. For a full list of European, Asian, and Canadian International History Bee champions, see the International History Bee and Bowl page. For a full list of USA National History Bee National Champions, see the National History Bee and Bowl page. Please note that the "International History Bee" is an individual event, as opposed to the "International History Bowl" which is the team event.

Varsity

Junior Varsity

Middle School

Elementary

International History Bowl World Champions 
One of the marquis events at the International History Olympiad is the International History Bowl World Championships. In contrast with all other International History Bowl events, where students compete on teams representing their schools, at the Olympiad, students compete on their designated Olympiad-specific teams. Also, while teams at other International History Bowl events typically feature four students playing at once, and permit teams of 1-6 students (at regionals) and 1-unlimited students (at Championships), the Olympiad features only teams of either 2 or 3 students. Wherever possible, teams consist exclusively of students in an age division from one US state or country. However, if only one student registers for the Olympiad from a particular affiliation, then that student will be paired with 1 or 2 other students from other affiliations. For a full list of European, Asian, and Canadian International History Bowl champions, see the International History Bee and Bowl page. For a full list of USA National History Bowl National Champions, see the National History Bee and Bowl page.

Varsity

Junior Varsity

Middle school

Elementary

See also 
 International History Bee and Bowl
 National History Bee and Bowl
 International Geography Bee

References

External links 

 

International Academic Competitions
Recurring events established in 2015